Viktor Petrovich Ivannikov (27 February 1940 – 27 November 2016) was a Russian computer scientist, a member of Russian Academy of Sciences, the head of System Programming Chair for the Institute for System Programming, head of the Departments of system programming at the Faculty of Computational Mathematics and Cybernetics, Moscow State University and the Moscow Institute of Physics and Technology.

Scientific achievements
Viktor Ivannikov worked for Lebedev Institute of Precision Mechanics and Computer Engineering from 1962 to 1980, starting as a computer technician, leaving as a distinguished engineer, where he developed D-68 (operating system) operating system for BESM-6 computer. After that he worked for Delta research facility where he led the development of distributed operating systems and supercomputers.

Interests
Viktor Ivannikov interests include: system programming, computer architecture, and operating systems.

External links
 Viktor Ivannikov — scientific works on the website Math-Net.Ru
 RAS person page
 System Programming Chair

1940 births
2016 deaths
Russian computer scientists
Full Members of the Russian Academy of Sciences
Moscow Institute of Physics and Technology alumni
Burials in Troyekurovskoye Cemetery
Academic staff of Moscow State University
Academic staff of the Higher School of Economics